Calcium azide is a chemical compound with the formula .

Production
It can be obtained from a distilled reaction between hydrazoic acid and calcium hydroxide.

Safety
Calcium azide is sensitive to impact, in which it may detonate and ignite.

References

Azides
Calcium compounds